Phone Power is the nineteenth studio album from New York City-based alternative rock band They Might Be Giants, released digitally on March 8, 2016. It is the third and final album containing songs from the band's 2015 Dial-A-Song service. British label Lojinx announced a physical release in Europe, on CD, for June 10.

Background
In late 2014 They Might Be Giants announced they would be reviving their Dial-A-Song service, with a new track released every week of 2015. The songs would be released as three separate studio albums (the first two, Glean and Why?, were released in 2015) as part of a "Dial-A-Song compilation" which would be included as benefits in the 2015 They Might Be Giants Instant Fan Club.

Release
Phone Power was released digitally on March 8, 2016 for the public (and one day earlier for Instant Fan Club members), and the first They Might Be Giants release to feature a pay-what-you-want model. This was discontinued in June 2016, switching to a traditional flat payment model.

Track listing

Personnel
They Might Be Giants
John Flansburgh – vocals, guitars, etc.
John Linnell – vocals, keyboards, woodwinds, etc.
are joined by
 Marty Beller – drums, percussion
 Danny Weinkauf – bass
 Dan Miller – guitars
Production
 Pat Dillett – co-producer, mixing
 Jon Altschuler – engineer
 David Groener Jr. – engineer
 Andre Kelman – engineer
 James York - engineer
 UE Nastasi - mastering
 Paul Sahre – design

Charts

References

2016 albums
Idlewild Recordings albums
They Might Be Giants albums
Lojinx albums
Albums free for download by copyright owner
Albums produced by Pat Dillett